The Furzebrook Railway, also known as the Pike Brothers' Tramway, was a narrow gauge industrial railway on the Isle of Purbeck in the English county of Dorset. It was built by the Pike Brothers, to take Purbeck Ball Clay from their clay pits near Furzebrook and West Creech to a wharf at Ridge on the River Frome.

History 
Clay Merchant Joseph Pike created his firm around 1760 in Chudleigh in Devon, but it was his son William Pike (born 1762) who started a branch of the firm in Purbeck. He signed a contract with Wedgwood in 1791. Originally the output was taken by horse to Wareham, from where it was taken by barge on the River Frome to Poole Harbour. William's sons (William Joseph and John William) took over the business and formed the company as Pike Bros. Wedgwood's success increased demand so much that the horses struggled to keep pace.
The nearest competitor, Benjamin Fayle at nearby Norden, had built Dorset's first railway - the Middlebere Plateway to take his clay to the south shore of Poole Harbour in 1806. Around 1840 the Pike Brothers William Joseph and John William followed suit by building the Furzebrook Railway to Ridge, about half a mile downstream from Wareham. The line was engineered with a continual downhill gradient, and loaded clay wagons were run by gravity, with the empty wagons being hauled back by horses. To facilitate this, some wagons were equipped with sledge brakes acting directly on the rail.

William Joseph Pike met with George Stephenson in Birmingham and became convinced that way forward lay in the excellent economics of steam railways. By this time, the original workings at the "Blue Pool" in Furzebrook were worked out, and the railway was diverted to the west at its upper end, and extended with several branches serving clay pits at Povington, Cotness, Greenspecks and Creech Grange.

When it opened in 1885, the London and South Western Railway standard gauge line from Wareham to Swanage simply passed over the Furzebrook Railway, with no connection. However, in 1902, interchange sidings were constructed at Furzebrook to allow clay to be shipped out by main line rail. A new locomotive shed and workshops were built at the interchange point.

Even after steam locomotives were introduced, gravity propulsion was not entirely abandoned. Up to the second world war, a well known sight was a single wagon train carrying clay pit workers back to their homes in Ridge in this way. The line terminated at the Swanage Railway branch, with the line to Ridge being removed by the military.  In 1955 road transport started to be used to transport the clay, and the last use of the Furzebrook Railway was in 1957.

Locomotives 

The locomotives used by the railway include:

Remains
The line's engine shed at Ridge still exists, and is a listed building. The route of the line from Ridge to Furzebrook can be traced on the ground and on maps. As noted above, the steam locomotive Secundus has survived.

A weighbridge building of similar design to the Ridge engine shed also survives at Furzebrook Works, adjacent to the former Furzebrook Road level crossing.

See also
British industrial narrow gauge railways

References

Bibliography

External links
Purbeck Mineral & Mining Museum page on the Furzebrook Railway

Isle of Purbeck
Early British railway companies
Industrial railways in England
Pre-grouping British railway companies
Rail transport in Dorset
2 ft 6 in gauge railways in England
Railway lines opened in 1840
Railway lines closed in 1957
Horse-drawn railways
4 ft gauge railways in England